Daniil Olegovich Krivoruchko (born 24 March 1998) is a Russian football player. He plays for FC Novosibirsk.

Club career
He made his debut in the Russian Professional Football League for FC Orenburg-2 on 27 July 2017 in a game against FC Chelyabinsk.

He made his debut for the main squad of FC Orenburg on 25 September 2018 in a Russian Cup game against FC Dynamo Barnaul. He made his Russian Premier League debut for Orenburg on 5 July 2020 in a game against FC Rubin Kazan, replacing Žiga Škoflek in the 81st minute. Orenburg was relegated at the end of the 2019–20 season, and Krivoruchko returned on a second loan to FC KAMAZ Naberezhnye Chelny.

References

External links
 
 Profile by Russian Professional Football League
 
 

1998 births
People from Orenburg
Sportspeople from Orenburg Oblast
Living people
Russian footballers
Association football defenders
FC Orenburg players
FC KAMAZ Naberezhnye Chelny players
FC Nosta Novotroitsk players
FC Tyumen players
Russian Premier League players
Russian Second League players